Jindřich Antonín Valášek (27 June 1886 – 28 March 1956) was a Czech footballer who played as a left winger.

Club career
During his playing career, Valášek played for Meteor Prague between 1905 and 1915. Following World War I, Valášek joined Malešice-based club Sparta XI.

International career
On 1 April 1906, Valášek made his debut for Bohemia in Bohemia's second game, scoring in a 1–1 draw against Hungary. Valášek would later make one final appearance for Bohemia, a year later against the same opposition.

International goals
Scores and results list Bohemia's goal tally first.

Notes

References

1886 births
1956 deaths
Footballers from Prague
Association football wingers
Czech footballers
Czechoslovak footballers
Bohemia international footballers
Footballers from the Austro-Hungarian Empire